The Dead River is a  arm of Alamoosook Lake in the town of Orland in Hancock County, Maine. Via Alamoosook Lake, the Narramissic River, and the Orland River, it is part of the Penobscot River watershed. It is formed by the junction of Moosehorn Stream and Hothole Stream and extends south to the main body of Alamoosook Lake.

See also
List of rivers of Maine

References

External links 

Tributaries of the Penobscot River
Rivers of Maine